Acrobasis celticola is a species of snout moth in the genus Acrobasis. It was described by Staudinger, 1879. It is found in Asia Minor.

References

Moths described in 1879
Acrobasis
Moths of Asia